Jean Guizerix (born 27 October 1945) is a French ballet dancer and choreographer.

Biography
Born in Paris in 1945, Guizerix is described as "tall and muscular, with a brooding Basque face". He studied dance privately before he joined the Paris Opera Ballet (1964). He was nominated etoile (star) eight years later. His wife, Wilfride Piollet, is also a former etoile of the Paris Opera Ballet. They created their own company in 1980. His awards include the laureate of French Grand Prix de la Danse (1984) as well as chevalier of the Order for Merits (1989).
In 1994, he premiered at the Aix Danse Festival ″Les sept dernières paroles du Christ″ (The seven last words of the Christ) by Joseph Haydn, choreographed by Christine Bastin, Mark Tompkins, Michel Kelemenis, Dominique Boivin, François Raffinot, François Verret, Andy Degroat, and Daniel Larrieu.

References

External links

 Jean Guizerix at Internet Danse DataBase
 Jean Guizerix at Dansez.com
 Association de Wilfride Piollet et Jean Guizerix (Clef de Sole)
 Interview with Jean Guizerix by Katharine Kanter (2003)

1945 births
Living people
French choreographers
Paris Opera Ballet étoiles
Knights of the Ordre national du Mérite